is a Japanese manga series by Mine Yoshizaki. It was adapted into an anime series animated by Shaft and released directly on video. The first episode aired on television prior to the release of the first video. The series was licensed in English by Central Park Media, distributed under the U.S. Manga Corps label.

The series is set in 1984 and stars Fubuki Sakuragasaki, a gamer whose "passion panties" give her special gaming powers. She has a winged magical girl form, and she has a sword while in this form. The series has homages to Pac-Man, Virtua Fighter, and other games like Sonic the Hedgehog and Klonoa.

Jonathan Clements and Helen McCarthy, authors of The Anime Encyclopedia, Revised & Expanded Edition: A Guide to Japanese Animation Since 1917, stated that the series began as a gag anime but became "a preachy family fable too long-winded to sustain its jokes". Clements and McCarthy wrote that the series "inherits the mantle of Game Center Arashi".

Characters

A ordinary middle school girl with poor athletic ability but excels in video games, she had become inspired for gaming after receiving white Passion Panty from Arashi at a young age.

Daughter of Masao, and Fubuki's friend and Game Middle School classmate. She first met Fubuki when Fubuki was playing a New Uma Catcher claw catcher game outside ARASHI arcade.

A boy who stalks Fubuki to shoot her panty shots, but does not take interest in panty shots of others. He is often seen hiding in a vaulting box.
/
Fubuki's mother.

The buck-toothed lead character from Game Center Arashi. After resurrecting Fubuki's father and discovering his plan of world domination, he ran off with the white Passion Panty that would later be given to Fubuki.
/Seed
A man wearing pink Pac-Man ghost mask, and the champion of the previous World BAG Tournament. In the 2nd World BAG Tournament, he faced Fubuki as final opponent in a Moon Cresta game, but the match was interrupted, leading to him joining Fubuki to play cooperatively in X. In the bonus stage of X, he was defeated by Mister 20. After the tournament ended, he wears the same mask with a number '2' on it.

Hanako's father, and KOGC Co., Ltd. founder and president.

A semi-finallist in the restarted Japan BAG Tournament that was defeated by Fubuki in Virtua Fighter (Remix?). In World BAG Tournament, she traded place with Raptor while wearing a costume resembling it. Only after losing to Fubuki in Fighting Vipers 2 that others realized the switch.
/Joe Dallas
Fubuki's opponent in the final match of Tokyo BAG Tournament, specializing in boxing technique to manipulate game controller. He was defeated by Fubuki in Crazy Climber.
Nicponski
World BAG Tournament finalist from Republic of Armenia, wearing a grey trenchcoat, a white scarf, a black hat with white trim, glasses with swirl pattern.
Chadale
World BAG Tournament finalist from India, wearing yellow suit, a yellow pointed hat, white shoes.
Queen Cobra
World BAG Tournament finalist from Egypt, wearing a pink scarf, a black bra, a yellow tiara, a yellow skirt with black spots.
Un Yong Kim
World BAG Tournament finalist from South, wearing white suit with blue rim shirt, a purple belt.

BAG Tournament's commmentator.

BAG Tournament's referee.
Poker
United Nation's secretary general.

Gyulassic Group/Gulassic Group

An executive from Group. She leads Zakko minions in missions.
/
The first lord from the Group specializing in shooter games from Osaka, and the wearer of black Passion Panty. She joined the Group in exchange for the arcade version of Tranquilizer Gun for the game centre Dig manager in Hell's River that had sold it to pay for debts, but Alka broke the promise. She first meet Fubuki in Game Middle School and joined the school as transfer student. After defeating Fubuki in Japan BAG Tournament final in Fantasy Zone, she was defeated by Fubuki in the restarted Japan final in the same game. Following the loss, Hanako sent the rare game to Chizuru. She is often seen wearing Pooka (from Dig Dug) goggles and roller skates.

The second lord from the Group from USA, specializing in dancing games. She first appeared in a game centre in KOGC Hotel in Hell's River playing Dancing evolution 2nd dancing game. In the World BAG Tournament final, she lost to Fubuki in Virtua Fighter 4.

A red-suited masked minion.

A purple-suited masked minion.

A green-suited masked minion.
Raptor
The third lord from the Group, it is a velociraptor created using the DNA extracted from a blood-sucking bee trapped in amber. In the World BAG Tournament final, it traded places with Leila Rurilan while resting. As the tournament entered final phase, it became Leila's pet after being fed with leftover lunch.
Mister 20
The fourth lord from the Group, and the final boss in the bonus stage in X, a game designed by Fubuki's father, which he also played as in the game. Following Mr. Mystery's defeat in X, players across the world connect to X's network, slowing down his processing speed, and was subsequently defeated by Fubuki.
/Leader
The mysterious leader of the group, and Fubuki's father. Originally working for KOGC Co. Ltd. to develop video games, he quit the job after witnessing a fight in a KOGC Co. Ltd. Game Garden game centre with gamers reenacting Mach Fist in a fighting video game, followed by seeing a news report of KOGC-developed processors being used to power missiles to kill people. During a journey to stop a missile attack, his body was injured by the missile explosion, but was resurrected by Arashi and his mind was transferred to a machine. After Fubuki's meeting with the Leader, he decided to go on another journey to the vast seas, leaving Fubuki to Ruriko's care.

Anime
Arcade Gamer Fubuki was directed by Yūji Mutō at Shaft, was written by Ryōta Yamaguchi, has animation character designs by Hideyuki Morioka, and features music composed by Ryūichi Katsumata. Mutō wrote the scripts for all of the episodes with the exception of the special, which was written by the manga's creator: Mine Yoshizaki. Two episodes were produced with assistance from other studios: episode 2 at A.C.G.T, and episode 3 at M.S.C.

Cast

Episode list

Notes

References

External links
Bandai Visual website 
Genco site 
Shaft Animation Studio site 
Central Park Media site

2002 anime
Shōnen manga
Enterbrain manga
Kadokawa Dwango franchises
Shaft (company)